Mullah Muhammad Shirin Akhund is an Afghan Taliban politician who served as the Governor of Kabul from 24 August 2021 to 7 November 2021. He was also a member of the negotiation team in Qatar office. He was in charge of Mullah Omar's security during the 1996–2001 Islamic Emirate of Afghanistan, and one of Mullah Omar's close associates. He also served as commander of military intelligence and the governor of Kandahar province.

References

Living people
Taliban leaders
Taliban governors
Governors of Kandahar Province
Governors of Kabul Province
Year of birth missing (living people)